Clench  may refer to:

People
Clench (surname)

Places in England
 Clench, Wiltshire, in the parish of Milton Lilbourne
 Clench Mill, a windmill in Wiltshire
 Clench Common, a hamlet in the parish of Savernake, Wiltshire

In fiction
 Clench (Transformers), a fictional character in the various Transformers universes

See also 
 Clinch (disambiguation)
 Clunch